Selwyn District is a predominantly rural district in central Canterbury, on the east coast of New Zealand's South Island. It is named after the Selwyn River / Waikirikiri, which is in turn named after Bishop George Selwyn, the first Anglican bishop of New Zealand who, in 1843 and 1844, travelled the length of the country by horse, foot, boat and canoe, leaving in his wake a sprinkling of locations that now bear his name.

History 
The first inhabitants of the area were the Māori who first settled New Zealand from the Cook and Society Islands about 700 years ago. The predominant Māori tribe today, in Selwyn and most of the rest of the South Island, is Ngāi Tahu, whose local marae (meeting house) is at Taumutu near the exit of Lake Ellesmere (Te Waihora).

In the late 19th century, European (chiefly British) colonists arrived and carved the area up into farmland. This has remained the predominant pattern ever since.

The Selwyn District as a unit of government was formed in the 1989 local government reforms from a legislated merger of the Malvern and Ellesmere counties, along with a portion of Paparua County.

Since this time, the district has enjoyed a stable and prosperous existence. Recent years have seen above-average population growth, making it the fastest-growing local authority in New Zealand in 2013.

Most of Selwyn's new residents have moved from Christchurch to settle on small "lifestyle" farms and in Selwyn's small towns which are within easy commuting distance of the city (e.g. Rolleston, Prebbleton, Lincoln, West Melton, Kirwee). Rolleston is the largest town in Selwyn.

Selwyn District, along with Christchurch and Waimakariri District, experienced some damage in the 2010 Canterbury earthquake. The earthquake epicentre was located just outside Darfield.

Government 
The district is governed by an elected mayor and a council of 11 members, elected simultaneously every 3 years. The current mayor is Sam Broughton, who was first elected mayor in October 2016.

The mayor is elected on a First Past the Post basis.

The 11 councillors are elected from four wards on a multi-member First Past the Post basis; the total number of votes a candidate receives are considered:

a.) 2 councillors are elected from Ellesmere Ward
b.) 2 councillors are elected from Malvern Ward
c.) 4 councillors are elected from Selwyn Central Ward
d.) 3 councillors are elected from Springs Ward

The Malvern Ward also has a Community Board, which has power delegated to it by the Council.

The Selwyn district is within the Canterbury Region so Canterbury Regional Council has responsibilities for regional planning, and water, air, discharge and river bed resource consents.

The Selwyn district has powers delegated to it by the Government of New Zealand, and carries out its duties with regard to laws such as the Local Government Act 2002 and the Resource Management Act 1991.

In national politics, Selwyn is represented in the Selwyn electorate. Nicola Grigg of the National Party is the incumbent MP.

Geography 
The Selwyn District lies in central Canterbury, and occupies a central position in the South Island.

Boundaries: On the Canterbury Plains, the Waimakariri River forms the northern boundary; in the hill country the border with the Hurunui District is more arbitrary. The eastern boundary comprises (from north to south) the city of Christchurch, Banks Peninsula, and the South Pacific Ocean. The southern boundary is the Rakaia River, beyond which lies Ashburton District. The western boundary is the main divide of the Southern Alps.

Geographical features: Selwyn District contains within it two distinct regions: the plains and the high country. The plains, where most of the population lives and the majority of activity takes place, form an expanse of low-lying, flat, and comparatively dry grassland. The extreme south-east is dominated by Lake Ellesmere / Te Waihora, an expanse of water surrounded by marshes, formed by the out-flow of the Selwyn River / Waikirikiri. The tributaries of the Selwyn River include the Waianiwaniwa River, the Hororata River and the Hawkins River.

The high country is a sparsely-populated region, mainly consisting of hill and mountain ranges and narrow river valleys. Most of the high country is grassland, including some tussocklands; areas of beech forest remain within the Craigieburn Forest Park and the Arthur's Pass National Park.

Climate: The plains have a temperate climate, characterised by warm, dry summers and cool winters. The Southern Alps are responsible for the relatively low rainfall, and also lead to a foehn wind, the "Canterbury Nor'Wester". This strong, hot and dry wind is most common in spring and summer, and on occasion reaches damage-causing strength. In the mountain country of the Southern Alps, conditions are much colder and wetter.

Demographics

Selwyn District had a population of 60,561 at the 2018 New Zealand census, an increase of 15,966 people (35.8%) since the 2013 census, and an increase of 26,916 people (80.0%) since the 2006 census. There were 20,631 households. There were 30,591 males and 29,970 females, giving a sex ratio of 1.02 males per female. The median age was 37.6 years (compared with 37.4 years nationally), with 13,452 people (22.2%) aged under 15 years, 10,833 (17.9%) aged 15 to 29, 29,301 (48.4%) aged 30 to 64, and 6,975 (11.5%) aged 65 or older.

Ethnicities were 89.3% European/Pākehā, 7.9% Māori, 1.7% Pacific peoples, 6.4% Asian, and 2.6% other ethnicities. People may identify with more than one ethnicity.

The percentage of people born overseas was 19.7, compared with 27.1% nationally.

Although some people objected to giving their religion, 55.2% had no religion, 35.2% were Christian, 0.6% were Hindu, 0.4% were Muslim, 0.5% were Buddhist and 1.9% had other religions.

Of those at least 15 years old, 10,305 (21.9%) people had a bachelor or higher degree, and 6,930 (14.7%) people had no formal qualifications. The median income was $42,700, compared with $31,800 nationally. 11,577 people (24.6%) earned over $70,000 compared to 17.2% nationally. The employment status of those at least 15 was that 27,345 (58.0%) people were employed full-time, 7,806 (16.6%) were part-time, and 1,053 (2.2%) were unemployed.

Urban areas 
The Selwyn District has six towns with a population over 1,000. Together they are home to % of the district's population.

Economy 
Much of the district's economy is based around farming. Most of this is pastoral: beef cattle and sheep in drier areas, and dairy and deer farming in wetter areas. Some horsebreeding is also done. There is also a substantial amount of cropping; wheat and barley are grown on the plains, along with smaller amounts of grapes and other fruit, vegetables, mushrooms and flowers.

Selwyn District experienced the strongest economic growth of any district in New Zealand in 2012, with employment growing by 9.5%, compared to the national average of 1%. 1,200 new jobs were created in the district in 2012.

The services in the small towns primarily serve the surrounding community. The major exception is the town of Lincoln, home to a University and a number of Crown Research Institutes and other organisations concerned with scientific research. Rolleston is also home to IZONE – New Zealand's largest business park.

The Selwyn District Council owns 11% shareholding in Orion, the local electricity distribution company.

References

External links 

 Selwyn District Council
 Map of the District
 Darfield Weather